Ladies of Leisure is a 1926 American silent melodrama film produced and distributed by Columbia Pictures. It was directed by Tom Buckingham and stars Elaine Hammerstein.

This film is not related in story to the 1930 Frank Capra film of the same name. However, both films are held by the Library of Congress.

Cast
Elaine Hammerstein as Mamie Taylor
T. Roy Barnes as Eric Van Norden
Robert Ellis as Jack Forrest
Gertrude Short as Marian Forrest
Tom Ricketts as Wadleigh
Jim Mason as Eddie Lanigan
Joseph W. Girard as Detective

References

External links
Ladies of Leisure at IMDb
allmovie/synopsis; Ladies of Leisure

1926 films
American silent feature films
Columbia Pictures films
Films directed by Tom Buckingham
Silent American drama films
1926 drama films
American black-and-white films
Melodrama films
1920s American films